The 1926 United States Senate election in Washington was held on November 2, 1926. Incumbent Republican U.S. Senator Wesley Livsey Jones was re-elected to a fourth term in office over Seattle attorney A. Scott Bullitt.

Frank E. Hammond, one of the losing candidates on the Republican side, ran as a "wet" candidate, opposing the prohibition of alcohol, which was already in effect in Washington state, but not yet nationally.

Blanket primary

Candidates

Democratic
A. Scott Bullitt, Seattle attorney
James Cleveland Longstreet

Republican
Austin E. Griffiths, candidate for Mayor of Seattle in 1916 and U.S. Senate in 1922
Frank E. Hammond
Lee Roy Henry
Wesley Livsey Jones, incumbent Senator since 1909

Results

General election

Candidates
 A. Scott Bullitt, Seattle attorney (Democratic)
 David D. Burgess (Socialist Labor)
 J. L. Freeman (Farmer-Labor)
 Wesley Livsey Jones, incumbent U.S. Senator since 1908 (Republican)

Results

See also 
 1926 United States Senate elections

References 

1926
United States Senate
Washington